The Albury Football Club, nicknamed the Tigers, is an Australian rules football and netball club based in Albury, a major regional city in New South Wales. Albury football and netball squads compete in the Ovens & Murray Football League.

Club history
On Saturday night, 3 June 1876, upwards of twenty gentlemen of the town of Albury assembled at Day's Commercial Chambers for the purpose of establishing a football club. The chair was occupied by Mr. M P Ryan. It was resolved on the proposal of Mr. John Day 'That a football club be established to be designated the Albury Football Club.' The following gentlemen were office bearers for the ensuing year – President – Mr. John Day, Treasurer and Secretary – Mr. Phillips. The committee agreed to adopt the Victorian rules of football.

It appears from newspaper reports that the first match that Albury played was against the Beechworth Football Club on the Beechworth Cricket Ground, on Saturday, 8 July 1876, with Dr. Duncan captaining the Albury side.

There appears to be no newspaper records of the Albury Football Club in 1877.

On Saturday, 11 May 1878, a meeting was held at the Albury Hotel "to resuscitate the defunct football club....and that records of the original club were not extant". Dr. J C Duncan was elected president, John Wilkinson, Secretary and A Dawson, Treasurer.

In April 1895 at an Ovens and Murray Football Association meeting, it was decided to let both Albury and Border United Football Club (Corowa based) join the O&MFA.

In 1897 Albury had their team photo taken and can be viewed via this link.

In 1910, the O&MFA had only three teams – Albury, Excelsior and Rutherglen with Rutherglen winning the premiership.

Then in 1911, both Excelsior and Rutherglen applied to enter the Rutherglen and District Football Association. As a result, the O&MFA folded, with local teams attempting to apply to play in the Rutherglen & DFA. A ballot took place at a Rutherglen & DFA meeting on 29 April at Mackay's Hotel, Rutherglen which resulted in Balldale, North Albury, Rutherglen, South Albury and Wodonga being refused admission to join the association. Corowa, Excelsior and Lake Rovers were clubs that were admitted. In 1911, the Albury Football Club was planning to divide the club into South Albury and North Albury teams, but as they were not admitted into the Rutherglen & DFA, the club went into recess in 1911.

Albury FC and Rutherglen FC were admitted into the Rutherglen & DFA in 1912.

After a three-year break due to World War I, the O&MFA reformed for the 1919 season with only four clubs, Border United Football Club (Corowa based), Howlong, Lake Rovers and Rutherglen. Albury Football Club was reformed in early 1919 and played in the Albury Senior Football Association with two teams – South Albury and North Albury, with St. Patrick's FC defeating South Albury Football Club in the grand final on the Albury Sportsground.

In 1920 the O&MFA did not reform; "It seems strange that the O&MFA has apparently been allowed to die a natural death" with only two club's present at the O&MFA – AGM, with some clubs moving to play in the Chiltern & DFA and Coreen & DFA.

In 1920, Albury lost the Albury Senior Football Association semi final to Diggers.

In March, 1924, Albury FC and the Diggers FC decided to amalgamate and apply for admission into the Ovens and Murray Football League as Albury Football Club.

In 1927, Albury appointed former West Adelaide Football Club captain/coach and 1922 Magarey Medallist, Robert "Bobby" Barnes as coach.

On 5 March 1929 at an O&MFL meeting, most club's were very much opposed to the professionalism and paying of players payments to Albury, Hume Weir and St. Patrick's FC footballers, in which the financial resources required were out of reach for the existing clubs - Beechworth, Corowa, Rutherglen and Wangaratta. These clubs were also opposed to the pooling of gate takings too. These clubs demanded that the Albury clubs must have certain restrictions imposed on them so the other clubs could be competitive, basically to restrict the number of imported and paid players and coaches by imposing strict residential qualifications.

On 17 March 1929 at an O&M meeting it was proposed that three Albury club's be formed on a territorial / residential basis, which meant that both the Albury and St. Patrick's football decided to disband and form a local Albury competition, but both clubs later decided to form both East and West Albury football club's based on strict residential boundaries and apply for admission to the O&MFL.

Both Albury and St. Patrick's did not disband due to religious tension or because of sectarian lines as reported at Ovens and Murray Football League, but due to pressure and new rules placed on them by other O&MFL club's to weaken their strength and to halt player payments by these two Albury teams. These are actual documented facts as per the references/citations in the above two paragraphs.

East Albury Football Club and Weir United Football Club merged in 1933 to become the Border United Football Club (Albury based) and wore green and white jumpers. In 1933 West Albury Football Club changed its name to the Albury Football Club and remained in the West Albury colours of maroon and blue.

At the 1934 O&MFL Annual General Meeting, the Albury FC requested to change it football jumpers to black and yellow, which was granted.

Triple Brownlow Medallist and triple Sandover Medallist, Haydn Bunton senior played with the Albury Rovers Football Club in 1926 and 1927, then Albury Football Club in 1928 and 1929 and then with West Albury Football Club in 1930 and 1931. The 1936 Brownlow Medallist, Denis Ryan actually played with the Albury Rovers Football Club, in the Albury & District Football League prior to joining Fitzroy Football Club in 1935.

In 1936, Border United Football Club (Albury based) would merge with the Albury FC when both clubs were short of players and both in debt and took on the name of Albury Football Club!

Between 1927 and 1935, Albury Football Club and its affiliated club's participated in nine consecutive O&MFL grand finals: 1927 and 1928 – Albury; 1929, 1930, 1931 and 1932 – West Albury; 1933, 1934 and 1935 – Border United. Albury FC then played in the 1937, 1939 and 1940 grand finals. Then immediately after the World War II recess, Albury played in the 1946, 1947 and 1948 grand finals, thus playing in 15 out of 17 grand finals, missing out in 1936 and 1938; a remarkable achievement!

This club history is a continual work in progress.

Football leagues
Albury have played in the following football competitions -
 Ovens & Murray Football League
 1895 to 1902
 Albury FC in recess 
1903 to 1906
 Ovens & Murray Football League
 1907 to 1910
 Albury FC in recess (In 1911, both Albury & Rutherglen were not admitted into the Rutherglen & DFA due to their previous strength)
1911
 Rutherglen & District Football Association
1912 & 1913
 Ovens & Murray Football League
 1914 & 1915
 World War I (O&MFL and Albury FC in recess)
 1916 to 1918
 Albury Senior Football Association
1919
 Albury & Border Football Association
1920 to 1923
 Ovens & Murray Football League
 1924 to 1928 (In 1924 Albury FC & Diggers FC decide to merge, both from the Albury & Border FA & enter the O&MFA as Albury FC)
 Ovens & Murray Football League
 1929 to 1932 (In 1929, both Albury & St. Patrick's FC's disband and two teams entered as East Albury & West Albury FC's)
 Ovens & Murray Football League
 1933 to 1935 (In 1933 East Albury merged with Weir United & became Border United FC. West Albury changed its name to Albury FC in 1933)
 Ovens & Murray Football League
 1936 to 1940 (In 1936 Border United merged with Albury and took on the name Albury FC)
 World War II
 1941 to 1945 (Albury and the O&MFL in recess)
 Ovens & Murray Football League
 1946 to 2020 (Albury FC)

Football premierships
Seniors
Albury Football Club
 Ovens & Murray Football League (22): 
1902 
1908
1913
1928
1937, 1939
1940, 1947
1956
1966 
1982, 1985 
1995, 1996, 1997 
2009 
2010, 2011, 2014, 2015, 2016, 2018

West Albury Football Club
1929

Border United Football Club (Albury based)
1934

Football – runners up
Seniors
Albury Football Club
 Ovens and Murray Football League (17)
1899, 1901, 1907, 1909, 1910, 1912, 1927, 1946, 1948, 1953, 1957, 1981, 1983, 1999, 2012, 2013, 2017
East Albury Football Club
1929
West Albury Football Club
1930, 1931, 1932
Border United Football Club (Albury based)
1933, 1935

Albury Senior Football Association
1919 (South Albury)

Albury & Border Football Association
 1921, 1922

Morris Medal winners
1935. Noel Barnett
1956. Lance Mann
1963. Ken Bennett
1965. Joe Ambrose
1981. Rod Coelli
1982. Peter Gorski
1993. Tim Scott
1994. Tim Scott
1995. Ken Howe
1996. Leigh Newton
2011. Shaun Daly
2012. Joel Mackie
2015. Joel Mackie
2017. Chris Hyde

Albury Football Club players who played in the VFL / AFL
The following 53 footballers played with Albury and / or (East Albury, West Albury & Border United in the 1930s) prior to playing senior football in the VFL/AFL, with the year indicating their VFL/AFL debut.

 1898 – Conrad ten Brink – Essendon
 1904 - Peter McCann - South Melbourne
 1904 - Arthur Percy - South Melbourne
 1904 – Bill Strang – South Melbourne
 1904 – Syd Wright – South Melbourne
 1905 - Frank Dunne - St. Kilda
 1910 - Les Frauenfelder - Richmond
 1913 – Dick Fitzgerald – South Melbourne
 1914 – Paddy Abbott – South Melbourne, Fitzroy, Richmond
 1925 - Hope Evans - Carlton
 1928 - Ray Usher - Melbourne
 1930 - Frank Beggs - Fitzroy
 1930 - Alex Clarke: North Melbourne
 1931 – Haydn Bunton – Fitzroy
 1931 – Doug Strang – Richmond
 1931 – Gordon Strang – Richmond
 1932 - Charlie Kolb - Richmond
 1932 - Laurie Plunkett - Fitzroy
 1933 – Bert Clarke – North Melbourne
 1933 -  Noel Barnett - Melbourne
 1933 – Colin Strang – St. Kilda
 1936 - Peter Chitty - St. Kilda 
 1939 - Frederick William Terrence "Tom" Davey - Hawthorn
 1939 - Don Seymour - Footscray
 1940 – Norm Betson – Essendon
 1941 – Les Main – Collingwood
 1942 – Jim Matthews – St. Kilda
 1944 – Leslie Gregory – Carlton
 1944 – Bill Wood – Footscray
 1947 – Allan Strang – South Melbourne
 1951 – Lance Mann – Essendon
 1951 – Loy Stewart – Geelong
 1954 – Keith Thomas – South Melbourne
 1955 - Colin Barton - Geelong
 1955 – Barry Takle – Hawthorn
 1959 – Dick Grimmond – Richmond
 1961 – Ray Thomas – Collingwood
 1962 - Neville Forge - South Melbourne
 1962 – Bill Lieschke – Essendon
 1965 – Geoff Strang – Richmond
 1965 – Bruce Waite – Essendon
 1968 - Bernie Brady - Collingwood
 1969 – John Duthie – North Melbourne
 1971 – Phil Baker – North Melbourne
 1974 – Peter Taylor – North Melbourne
 1976 – Gary Gray – North Melbourne
 1976 - Don Mattson - Richmond & Essendon
 1981 – Dennis Carroll – South Melbourne
 1984 – Tony Hughes – Sydney Swans
 1985 – Paul Spargo – North Melbourne & Brisbane Bears
 1991 – Ben Doolan – Sydney Swans
 1995 – Tim Scott – Sydney Swans
 1997 – Leigh Newton – Melbourne
 2002 – Daniel Cross – Footscray & Melbourne
 2017 - Will Setterfield - Greter Western Sydney & Carlton
 2018 – Charlie Spargo – Melbourne
 2019 – Zach Sproule – Greater Western Sydney

References

External links

 Albury FNC official website
 1929 - East Albury FC team photo
 1939 O&MFL Premiers - Albury FC - team photo

Ovens & Murray Football League clubs
Sports clubs established in 1876
Australian rules football clubs established in 1876
Sport in Albury, New South Wales
1876 establishments in Australia
Netball teams in New South Wales
Australian rules football clubs in New South Wales